Baochang is a small town, and the administrative center of the Taibus Banner in the Xilin Gol League, Inner Mongolia, China.  It was the county seat of Bǎochāng (寶昌) County  when it was part of the former Chahar province.

Cities in Inner Mongolia